Paulo Menezes (born 14 July 1982), also known as Paulinho, is a former footballer from Brazil who played as right back.

External links
 FC Aarau profile 
 
 

Living people
1982 births
Brazilian footballers
Brazilian expatriate footballers
FC Baden players
FC Aarau players
Grasshopper Club Zürich players
FC Lugano players
FC Schaffhausen players
Swiss Super League players
Swiss Challenge League players
Brazilian expatriate sportspeople in Switzerland
Expatriate footballers in Switzerland
Association football defenders